A Romance of Wastdale is a 1921 British silent adventure film directed by Maurice Elvey and starring Milton Rosmer, Valya Venitskaya and Fred Raynham. It was based on the 1895 novel of the same name by A. E. W. Mason.

Cast
 Milton Rosmer - David Gordon 
 Valya Venitskaya - Kate Nugent 
 Fred Raynham - Austin Hawke 
 Irene Rooke - Mrs Jackson

References

External links
 

1921 adventure films
1921 films
Films based on British novels
Films directed by Maurice Elvey
Films set in France
British silent feature films
Stoll Pictures films
Films shot at Cricklewood Studios
Films set in England
British black-and-white films
British adventure films
1920s British films
Silent adventure films